The West Bengal Legislative Assembly is the unicameral legislature of the Indian state of West Bengal. It is located in the B. B. D. Bagh area of Kolkata (Calcutta)-the Capital of the state. Members of the Legislative assembly are directly elected by the people. The legislative assembly comprises 294 Members of Legislative Assembly, all directly elected from single-seat constituencies. Its term is five years, unless sooner dissolved.

List of constituencies

The constituencies in the West Bengal are as follows:

References

West Bengal
 
West Bengal-related lists